The Rimatara reed warbler (Acrocephalus rimitarae)  is a species of Old World warbler in the family Acrocephalidae.
It is found only in Rimatara in French Polynesia.
Its natural habitats are subtropical or tropical dry forests and swamps. Due to its limited geographic distribution, this bird is classified as critically endangered on the International Union for Conservation of Nature (IUCN) Red List of Threatened Species.

References

Rimatara reed warbler
Birds of the Austral Islands
Rimatara reed warbler
Rimatara reed warbler
Taxonomy articles created by Polbot
Endemic birds of French Polynesia